Impossible Dream is the fourth studio album (fifth album overall) by the American folk musician Patty Griffin, released on April 20, 2004.  The album features an unlisted song – Griffin’s mother and father singing “The Impossible Dream” – at the end of “Top of the World.”

Impossible Dream reached a peak of number 67 on the Billboard 200 chart, selling 16,000 copies in the United States in its first week.

Track listing
All tracks composed by Patty Griffin

“Love Throw a Line” – 3:38
“Cold as It Gets” – 2:38
“Kite” – 3:09
“Standing” – 4:04
“Useless Desires” – 5:50
“Top of the World” – 5:28
“Rowing Song” – 3:26
“When It Don’t Come Easy” – 4:52
“Florida” – 5:01
“Mother of God” – 7:14
“Icicles” – 3:18

Personnel
Patty Griffin – vocals, guitar, piano
Emmylou Harris – background vocals
Lisa Germano – violin, zither
Ian McLagan – electric piano
Julie Miller – background vocals
Billy Beard – drums
Brian Beattie – bowed bass, pump organ
Doug Lancio – guitar, mandolin
Michael Ramos – trumpet
Frank Howard Swart – bass
Sumner Erickson – tuba
John Deaderick – organ
Brady Blade, Jr. – drums
JD Foster – bass, percussion
Jonathan Greene – drums

References

External links
Lyrics to the album on PattyNet.net

2004 albums
Patty Griffin albums